ASHS may refer to:
 Albany Senior High School (disambiguation)
 Alexandria Senior High School, Alexandria, Louisiana, United States
 All Saints High School (disambiguation)
 Abington Senior High School, Abington, Pennsylvania, United States
 Armadale Senior High School, Armadale, Western Australia, Australia
 Atherton State High School, Atherton, Queensland, Australia
 American Society for Horticultural Science, Alexandria, Virginia, United States

See also 
 ASH (disambiguation)